Psammodynastes is a genus of snakes of the family Pseudaspididae.

Species
 Psammodynastes pictus Günther, 1858
 Psammodynastes pulverulentus (Boie, 1827)

References

Snake genera
Pseudaspididae
Taxa named by Albert Günther